Mofu-Gudur, or South Mofu, is a Chadic language spoken in northern Cameroon.  Dialects are Dimeo, Gudur, Massagal, Mokong, Njeleng, and Zidim.

Mofu-Gudur is spoken in the massifs south of the Tsanaga River as far as Mayo-Louti (Mokong and Mofou cantons of Mokolo commune, Mayo-Tsanaga department, and Gawaza commune, Diamaré department, in the Far North Region) by 60,000 speakers.

Sign language
Speakers use an estimated 1,500 conventionalized gestures.  These are used in story-telling and reciting history, but also in situations not conducive to speech; when children are born deaf, or people go deaf later in life, the members have a system of communication available that will allow them to communicate with the entire community.

Notes

References
 Daniel Barreteau.  1988.  Description du mofu-gudur.  Paris:  Institut Français de Recherche Scientifique pour le Développement en Coopération. .
 L. Sorin-Barreteau, 1996, Le Langage Gestuel des Mofu-Gudur au Cameroun. PhD dissertation, University of Paris V-Rene' Descartes

Biu-Mandara languages
Languages of Cameroon
Non-deaf sign languages
Sign languages of Cameroon